But-Kazmalyar is a rural locality (a selo) in Magaramkentsky District, Republic of Dagestan, Russia. The population was 3,127 as of 2010. There are 33 streets.

Geography 
But-Kazmalyar is located 2 km east from Samur, 11 km northeast of Magaramkent (the district's administrative centre) by road. Novy Usur and Novy Aul are the nearest rural localities.

Nationalities 
Lezgins live there.

References 

Rural localities in Magaramkentsky District